Beef war or beef wars may refer to:
Beef hormone controversy or Beef War
Beef war, the ban on British beef associated with mad cow disease
Beef war, the conflict about United States beef imports in Taiwan

See also
United States beef imports in Japan
United States beef imports in South Korea 
2008 US beef protest in South Korea